Schenna is a comune (municipality) in South Tyrol in northern Italy, located in the Passeier Valley, about  northwest of the city of Bolzano.

Geography

Schenna borders the following municipalities: Hafling, Kuens, Merano, Riffian, St. Leonhard in Passeier, Sarntal, and Tirol.

Frazioni
The municipality contains the frazioni (subdivisions, mainly villages and hamlets) Schennaberg (Montescena), Tall (Valle), and Verdins.

History

Origin
In the Middle Ages an important castle was built. Archduke Johann of Austria acquired it in 1845. In the 1970s, 1980s and 1990s many festivals took place inside it, but now, for health and safety reasons (since there was no emergency exit) there are no more.

Inside the castle, known as "Schloss Schenna" Andreas Hofer's cot is to be found.

Place-name
"Schenna" comes from the German "Schön Au" meaning "Lovely Pasture" which is why it used to be written "Schönna", although others say that it is named after a Roman landowner called Sconius. In the 6th-7th century people began to arrive from Bavaria and Franconia.

Coat-of-arms
The shield is argent and sable party per fess; at the top a gules lion is represented coming out from the bottom. The emblem was adopted in 1972, even if it was in use prior to World War I.

Society

Linguistic distribution
According to the 2011 census, 98.18% of the population speak German, 1.67% Italian and 0.15% Ladin as first language.

Demographic evolution

References

External links

 Homepage of the municipality

Municipalities of South Tyrol